Combea is a genus of lichens in the family Opegraphaceae. It has two species. The genus was circumscribed by Italian botanist Giuseppe De Notaris in 1846.

The genus name of Combea is in honour of Francesco Comba (fl. 1845), an Italian lab assistant and draughtsman, from the Zoological Museum in Turin.

Species
Combea californica 
Combea mollusca

References

Arthoniomycetes
Lichen genera
Arthoniomycetes genera
Taxa described in 1846
Taxa named by Giuseppe De Notaris